The Admiral's Cup was an international yachting regatta.  For many years it was known as the unofficial world championship of offshore racing.

The Admiral's Cup regatta was started in 1957 and was normally a biennial event (occurring in odd-numbered years) which was competed for between national teams.  However the event was not staged in 2001 and was last held in 2003.  It was cancelled at short notice in 2005.

The 2003 event did not follow the normal format and allowed entries from any yacht club affiliated to a national authority, thus allowing the possibility of several teams per country.

The regatta was based at Cowes on the Isle of Wight off southern England and was organised by the Royal Ocean Racing Club.

History: 1957–1999
From 1957 to 1999 the cup was competed for between national teams, each having three boats.  Initially only Great Britain and the United States took part but, in later years, many other teams also participated.  The Fastnet race was part of the Admiral's Cup during this time.

The Australians won for the first time in 1967, the winning boat—Mercedes III—designed by Ted Kaufman and Bob Miller (later Ben Lexcen), who went on to success in the America's Cup.

In 1971 the British Prime Minister, Edward Heath, captained one of the winning boats.

Recent history
The 2003 event, the last held, was planned to be based in Dún Laoghaire in Ireland, but this was changed at short notice for reasons that are still unclear.  In addition, instead of being a competition between national teams, the event was competed between yacht clubs, each with two boats.

The 2005 event was cancelled only months before the event was to be held, after only two teams had entered.

Although the RORC was looking into reviving the event for 2011, this did not happen.

Winners

References

External links
The Admiral's Cup (on the RORC site)

Recurring sporting events established in 1957
Sport on the Isle of Wight
Sailing competitions in the United Kingdom
Yachting races